Coil zipper—also known as nylon coil zipper—is a type of zipper whose teeth/elements are made from coiled monofilament that is traditionally nylon. The coil is sewn to a zipper tape to make the final product. The final zipper product is completed when the nylon coiled teeth are sewn onto the zipper tape. Nylon coil zippers have a continuous coil chain made from nylon. When this coil is positioned on the back of the zipper and not in the front, this kind of zipper is called invisible zipper.

Design 
Nylon zippers are highly flexible and are available in a wide range of sizes. The high compatibility of the coil zippers is the main attribute for their huge number of applications in fashion wear, canvas goods, and bags. These types of zippers are also the top choice for the outdoor and luggage industries. Nylon coil zippers are most commonly found in tents, suitcases, backpacks, and other camping apparels.

Though nylon coil zippers are a popular choice for a large number of applications, the use of nylon is now being replaced with polyester. Polyester coil zippers are also becoming widespread. They are made in various gauge sizes and colors. This makes them well-suited to several use cases.

Benefits 
Coil zippers offer higher horizontal strength . Coil zippers are also easier to repair; an out-of-alignment tooth can be realigned simply by zipping and unzipping past it. Another advantage of nylon zippers is its two-way functionality. The sliders can be fixed in either direction of the zipper chain and they will can still function smoothly. Nylon is lightweight, heat resistant and rustproof, making nylon coil zippers durable and reliable.

Manufacturing
The main elements required in the manufacturing process of coil zipper are a stringer, slider, and a tab. The stringer consists of a tape and teeth assembly. The tab is used to pull the slider up and down which opens and closes the zipper.

Applications
Sports/Outdoor Apparel Sports and outdoor apparel need a sturdy zipper that can withstand harsh use. Coil zippers are strong and therefore are commonly used for these kinds of outdoor apparel.

Fashion/Apparel Like all zippers, coil zippers are often used in general apparel. Zippers are often required in different designs or vibrant colors to match the garments. Coil zippers are easily produced in various colors and sizes and thus they are often used fashionable garments.

Footwear Shoes and boots that use zippers in their design need a zipper which is smooth in its operation and has high strength. Coil zippers use nylon that provides enough strength to these zippers that they function well even in high-end boots and shoes.

Outdoor Gear Outdoor gear such as camping equipment and backpacks often need to be robust or cover a longer length. Nylon coil zippers have high strength all across their length. They can be used in all the items which need long zippers.

References

Textile closures
Fasteners
American inventions
1913 introductions